Charles Bright may refer to:

 Charles Edward Bright (1829–1915), businessman in colonial Victoria
 Charles Tilston Bright (1832–1888), British electrical engineer who oversaw the laying of the first transatlantic telegraph cable
 Sir Charles Bright (1863–1937), British electrical and civil engineer, son of Charles Tilston Bright
 Charles Bright (judge) (1912–1983), Australian judge